Nicholas Bond-Owen (born 13 November 1968) (sometimes billed as Nick or Nicholas Owen) is a child actor of the 1970s and 1980s best known for playing Tristram Fourmile in all five series of the popular comedy George and Mildred and in the film of the same name.

Biography 
Born in Ashford, Surrey in 1968 as Nicholas Owen, to parents Diane and Sid Owen, he got into acting by accident after his older brother signed with a child model agency. As there were already several Nicholas Owens registered as actors with Equity, he needed to pick a new name. As a fan of James Bond he chose 'Bond' and so became Bond-Owen. He went to school at Abbotsford County Secondary school in Ashford from 1980 to 1984 and then on to Spelthorne College until 1986, where he studied photography.

His first film role was as Kevin in Confessions from a Holiday Camp (1977). Other film appearances included Little Boy in Rhubarb Rhubarb (1980), Tristram Fourmile in George and Mildred (1980), and Freddie in Lassiter (1984) with Tom Selleck.

His television roles included Tristram Fourmile in George and Mildred (1976–1979), Park Ranger with Richard Gibson (1979),  Alan Shaw in Airline (1982), Peterkin in The Coral Island (1983), Charley Bates in Oliver Twist (1985), Graham in an episode of Dramarama (1986), First Boy in David Copperfield (1986), and Derek, a troubled teenager in an episode of the schools' series Starting Out (1986). In 2001 he was interviewed for the documentary The Unforgettable Yootha Joyce during which he reminisced about working with the actress Yootha Joyce.

Bond-Owen also appeared in television adverts for McDonald's, Barclays, Halifax Building Society, Cadbury's Flake and British Gas.

In 1987, aged 19, he left acting and for nearly 17 years worked for Penguin Books in all departments from courier to distributions manager. For 10 months he worked in the same capacity for Pearson Books and in 2014 was the distribution director for the free newspaper City A.M..

Personal life 
Bond-Owen lives with his wife Heidi. He has two sons.

Filmography

Television roles

References

External links
Bond-Owen on the British Film Institute website

1968 births
English male television actors
English male film actors
Living people
British book publishers (people)
British newspaper people
English male child actors